Pseudoscapanorhynchidae is a family of extinct mackerel sharks that lived during the Cretaceous and potentially the Paleogene. It currently includes Cretodus, Eoptolamna, Leptostyrax, Protolamna, Pseudoscapanorhynchus, and possibly Lilamna.

References

Lamniformes
Prehistoric cartilaginous fish families